Qube Cinema Technologies (formerly Real Image Media Technologies) is an Indian company operating in film and television technology. It provided digital non-linear editing and digital cinema sound to the Indian market in the 1990s. The company then began work in digital cinema products and deployment during the early years of the century.

History
Started in 1986 as Media Artists Pvt. Ltd. in Chennai (then Madras), India, the company was renamed to Real Image Media Technologies Pvt. Ltd. in the early 2000s after the merger of Real Image Pvt. Ltd. and JS Films into Media Artists Pvt. Ltd. Media Artists continued to be a brand of the company's audio post-production facilities until early 2017 but the primary focus of the company then moved to digital cinema and as of January 2018, the company's Qube digital cinema systems were installed in about 3760 screens in India. In 2017, the company was renamed to Qube Cinema Technologies Pvt. Ltd. and in November 2017, it announced the signing of a definitive agreement to merge with UFO Moviez Ltd. but after significant procedural roadblocks in the process at the NCLT Mumbai, the merger was called off in early 2019.

The first technology the company brought to India was computer-based non-linear editing with the Media Composer editing system from Avid Technology in 1993. Subsequently, the company brought digital cinema sound to India in a partnership with DTS in 1995.

In 2005, the company launched its own digital cinema system under the brand name Qube. Qube Cinema, Inc. was set up in the US as a subsidiary of Real Image Media Technologies and markets the digital cinema technology of the parent company worldwide.

Qube Cinema has 7 offices across India and a subsidiary in Los Angeles, Qube Cinema, Inc. The Qube product line is established globally, with about 7,000 installations across 48 countries so far and has digital cinema operations in 4,000 cinema screens across India.

Qube Cinema was founded by Jayendra Panchapakesan and Senthil Kumar to develop products for digital cinema in India.

In August 2011, Qube provided servers and technical support for the fourth year to the Venice Film Festival.

In September 2011, Qube introduced QubeMaster Xpress 2, for digital cinema mastering.

In March 2011, Qube introduced a 4K integrated media block (IMB) that is Ethernet-based, allowing exhibitors to have their storage servers within or outside of their theater. It allows for central storage in multiplex theatres and is designed to work with any digital projection system that supports an IMB.

Starting in 2012, Qube Cinema began installing its d-cinema servers and IMBs in Giant Screen theatres. In January 2012, Qube held the first public demonstration of 4K 3D streaming from a single server when they installed a d-cinema system at the Moody Gardens MG 3D Theater in Galveston, Texas. The transition of the Moody Gardens theater from 70 mm film to digital 3D used a Barco NV projector and Qube XP-I server and Xi IMBs. This installation was followed, in March 2012, by one at the Houston Museum of Natural Science, which became the first commercial installation of the Qube Cinema single-server 4K 3D system when it upgraded the museum's Giant Screen Theatre from 70 mm film to digital cinema. And, in October, Qube Cinema partnered with Global Immersion to install its d-cinema system at the Giant Screen theatre of the Peoria Riverfront Museum. In May 2012, Qube introduced server software capable of synchronizing multiple IMBs, making 4K 3D projection possible for theatre owners. In August 2013, Qube partnered with D3D Cinema to install its single-server True 4K 3D system at the newly renovated Air Force Museum Theater at the National Museum of the United States Air Force. In January 2014, Qube Cinema released software updates that added support for Dolby Atmos surround sound  as well as Barco Auro 11.1 sound to its flagship XP-I and XP-D servers.

In November 2014, the company was listed by iSPIRIT (Indian Software Product Industry Roundtable), a non-profit think tank, in its top 30 index of Indian software product companies.

Apart from providing digital cinema in India and selling the Qube digital cinema technology worldwide, the company also masters Indian feature films into the digital cinema format.

Intel Capital, the venture capital arm of Intel Corporation, Nomura, the Japanese bank, and StreetEdge Capital, a U.S. based investment partnership, are investors in Qube Cinema Technologies.

References 

Film sound production
Film production companies of India
Film production companies based in Chennai
Mass media companies established in 1986
1986 establishments in Tamil Nadu